Lieutenant Kenneth MacLeish, USNRF (19 September 1894 – 15 October 1918) was a  Naval aviator during World War I.

Born in Glencoe, Illinois, MacLeish was one of the twenty-eight original volunteers in the first Yale Unit which he joined as a Navy Electrician, 2nd Class on 26 March 1917.  He was appointed as an Ensign in the Naval Reserve Flying Corps 31 August 1917; promoted to Lieutenant Junior Grade on 1 June 1918, and to Lieutenant in mid-August of the same year.  MacLeish was the brother of Pulitzer Prize-winning poet Archibald MacLeish, and like him, attended Yale College.  A member of the class of 1918, he left school to serve in the war.  The young officer wrote home constantly, and his letters show the youthful enthusiasm and subsequent weariness of combat that is characteristic of men at war.  In France, he participated in many raids over the enemy's lines before he was transferred in September 1918 to Eastleigh, England.

On a raid with the Royal Air Force 14 October, his plane, a Sopwith Camel, was shot down and Lieutenant MacLeish was forced to crash land near Schore, Belgium and was found dead the following day by a local landlord, Alfred Rouse.   MacLeish was initially buried where he fell and then later reinterred at the Lyssenthoek Military Cemetery in June 1919.  He received his final resting place at the Flanders Field American Cemetery in Waregem, Belgium at plot B, row 4, grave 1.

He was posthumously awarded the Navy Cross for his actions.  His citation reads, "The Navy Cross is awarded to Lieutenant Kenneth MacLeish, U.S. Navy, for distinguished and heroic service as a pilot attached to the U. S. Naval Aviation Force in the war zone. Lieutenant MacLeish took part in operations against the enemy forces on land and was shot down and killed in the drive in Flanders during October, 1918."  The destroyer USS MacLeish (DD-220) was named for him.  Kenneth MacLeish's sister, Ishbel, went to Philadelphia at the request of Josephus Daniels, Secretary of the Navy, on 18 December 1919 and sponsored the ship at the launching.

References

1894 births
1918 deaths
United States Naval Aviators
Recipients of the Navy Cross (United States)
United States Navy officers
American military personnel killed in World War I
People from Glencoe, Illinois
United States Navy personnel of World War I
Military personnel from Illinois